Galesh Mahalleh may refer to:
 Galesh Mahalleh, Gilan
 Galesh Mahalleh, Behshahr, Mazandaran Province
 Galesh Mahalleh, Ramsar, Mazandaran Province